Raisa Vasilyevna Belyayeva (25 December 1912  19 July 1943) was one of the first Russian female fighter pilots. She fought alongside Lydia Litvyak and was credited with up to three aerial victories. She died in combat, from causes unknown, in 1943.

Early life
Belyayeva attended a technical institute for tanners in Kirov. After graduation she asked her old friend Olga Yamshchikova, a Leningrad flight instructor, to teach her to fly. Belyayeva soon proved herself an enthusiastic and indefatigable alumna. Before the war, she accumulated more than a 1,000 hours flight time and a hundred parachute jumps, instructing hundreds of parachutists. She also took part in many airshows over Tushino airfield, near Moscow.

Military career 
She took part in the Battle of Stalingrad and flew as an escort pilot for Nikita Khrushchev.

Belyaeya died in a crash on 19 July 1943.

References

Bibliography
 

 https://

1912 births
1943 deaths
Soviet women in World War II
Women air force personnel of the Soviet Union
Russian people of World War II
Soviet World War II pilots
Soviet military personnel killed in World War II
Russian women aviators